Enquin-les-Mines is a town and former commune in the Pas-de-Calais department in the Hauts-de-France region of France. Since January 2017, it is a delegated commune of Enquin-lez-Guinegatte.

The inhabitants of the town of Enquin-les-Mines are known as Enquinois, Enquinoises in French.

The commune was surrounded by the municipalities of Erny-Saint-Julien, Estrée-Blanche and Enguinegatte. The commune merged with the latter of these on 1 January 2017 to form the commune nouvelle of Enquin-lez-Guinegatte.

Geography
Enquin-les-Mines is a farming village situated 12 miles (19 km) southwest of Saint-Omer, at the D77 and D158 crossroads, by the banks of the small river Laquette.

Population

History
The village was subject to much damage during the siege of Thérouanne in 1553.  The neighbouring hamlets of Fléchinelle and Serny were joined with the commune in 1822.

Places of interest
 The church of St.Omer, dating from the fifteenth century.
 Traces of an ancient château.
 The fourteenth century Templars farm at Fléchinelle.
 The watermill at Serny, dating from 1635.
 The old coal mine.
 Café Chez Gilberte

See also
Communes of the Pas-de-Calais department

References

Enquinlesmines